ICMA may refer to:

 Chartered Institute of Management Accountants, formerly the Institute of Cost and Management Accountants
 International Capital Market Association
 International Card Manufacturers Association
 International Christian Maritime Association
 International City/County Management Association
 International Classical Music Awards
 International Computer Music Association
 Icma, a mountain in Peru

See also
 Institute of Cost and Management Accountants of Bangladesh
 Institute of Cost and Management Accountants of Pakistan